Joculator uveanus is a species of minute sea snail, a marine gastropod mollusc in the family Cerithiopsidae. The species was described by Melvill and Standen in 1896.

References

Gastropods described in 1896
uveanus